Lotte Lorring (born Erna Else Charlotte Budzinski; 6 December 1893 – 20 March 1939) was a German stage and film actress and operetta singer.

Death
Lorring died on 20 March 1939, aged 45, in Berlin, Germany.

Filmography

 Um der Liebe Willen (1920)
 Er bleibt in der Familie (1920)
 Der Verfluchte (1921)
 The Hurricane on the Mountain (1922)
 Die Dame in Grau (1922)
 Accommodations for Marriage (1926)
 Department Store Princess (1926)
 The Girl on a Swing (1926)
 Unmarried Daughters (1926)
 The Grey House (1926)
 The Uncle from the Provinces (1926)
 The Lorelei (1927)
 Ehekonflikte (1927)
 Todessturz im Zirkus Cesarelli (1927)
 Queen Louise (1927)
 His Greatest Bluff (1927)
 When the Young Wine Blossoms (1927)
 A Modern Dubarry (1927)
 Miss Chauffeur (1928)
 Charlotte Somewhat Crazy (1928)
 Dyckerpotts' Heirs (1928)
 Milak, the Greenland Hunter  (1928)
 The Women's War (1928)
 The Happy Vagabonds (1929)
 The Black Domino (1929)
 Wem gehört meine Frau? (1929)
 The Convict from Istanbul (1929)
 Menschen im Feuer (1930)
 The Tender Relatives (1930)
 Karriere (1930)
 Dangers of the Engagement Period (1930)
 Das Erlebnis einer Nacht (1930)
 Wiener Liebschaften (1931)
 Ich heirate meinen Mann (1931)
 Seine Freundin Annette (1931)
 The Concert (1931)
 Hooray, It's a Boy! (1931)
 I Do Not Want to Know Who You Are (1932)
 The Emperor's Waltz (1933)
 Ways to a Good Marriage (1933)
 Johannisnacht (1933)
 The Black Forest Girl (1933)
 Ich sing' mich in dein Herz hinein (1934)
 Light Cavalry (1935)

References

Bibliography
 Chandler, Charlotte. Marlene: Marlene Dietrich, A Personal Biography. Simon and Schuster, 2011.

External links

1893 births
1939 deaths
German stage actresses
German film actresses
German silent film actresses
Actresses from Berlin
20th-century German actresses
20th-century German women singers